The discography of American pop/CCM singer Stacie Orrico consists of three studio albums, one live album, one compilation album, four extended plays and nine commercial singles.

Orrico made her recording debut under ForeFront Records in 1998, when she was just 12 years old. In 2000, she released her first album under the label, entitled Genuine, and it sold 13,000 copies in its first week, making her the first female Christian singer to do so. It also managed to peak inside the Billboard 200. "Don't Look at Me" was the first single released to radio and it managed to top Christian charts for ten consecutive weeks. The title track and "Everything" were later released as commercial singles, but both failed to chart on the Billboard Hot 100.

In 2003, she released her self-titled second album, Stacie Orrico, after signing a contract with Virgin Records. The album sold over 500,000 copies in the US, peaking at number fifty-nine on the Billboard 200 and certifying Gold by the Recording Industry Association of America. The first single, "Stuck", charted at number fifty-two on the Hot 100, and even peaked at higher positions in other countries. The album's second single, "(There's Gotta Be) More to Life", reached number thirty on the Hot 100, becoming her biggest hit in the US. "I Promise" and "I Could Be the One" were later released as the following singles, and both failed to chart in the US. Worldwide sales of Stacie Orrico stands over 3.5 million copies.

She dropped from ForeFront Records in 2005, after being managed by the label for seven years. She still pursued her music career and began writing for her third studio album, Beautiful Awakening. The album was internationally released in August 2006, together with its first single, "I'm Not Missing You". The song charted at number nineteen on the Bubbling Under Hot 100 Singles chart.

Albums

Studio albums

Live albums

Compilation albums

Extended plays

Singles 

Notes

Other appearances

As vocalist

As songwriter

Leaked demos 

 2008: "Knock 'Em Out" (featuring Sleepy Brown)
 2013: "Catch Me If You Can" (featuring The Gabe Cummins Orchestra)

Videography

DVDs

Music videos

References 

General

 
 

Specific

Pop music discographies
Rhythm and blues discographies
Discographies of American artists
Christian music discographies